The One Hundred Eighth Ohio General Assembly was the legislative body of the state of Ohio in 1969 and 1970. In this General Assembly, both the Ohio Senate and the Ohio House of Representatives were controlled by the Republican Party.  In the Senate, there were 21 Republicans and 12 Democrats. In the House, there were 63 Republicans and 36 Democrats. It was the second General Assembly to use districts drawn after the 1966 apportionment.

Major events

Vacancies
January 13, 1969: Senator Frank W. King (D-11th) resigns.
January 30, 1969: Senator Harry V. Jump (R-13th) resigns.
February 9, 1970: Senator Calvin Johnson (D-9th) resigns.

Appointments
January 14, 1969: Marigene Valiquette is appointed to the 11th Senatorial District.
February 5, 1969: Robert J. Corts is appointed to the 13th Senatorial District.
February 11, 1970: Bill Bowen is appointed to the 9th Senatorial District.

Senate

Leadership

Majority leadership
 President of the Senate: John W. Brown
 President pro tempore of the Senate: Theodore Gray
 Majority Whip: Michael Maloney

Minority leadership
 Leader: Anthony Calabrese
 Assistant Leader: Oliver Ocasek

Members of the 108th Senate

House of Representatives

Leadership

Majority
Speaker of the House: Charles Kurfess
Speaker Pro Tempore: Charles Fry
Majority Leader: Robert Levitt
Assistant Majority Leader: Walter White

Minority
Minority Leader: John McDonald
Assistant Minority Leader: Anthony Russo
Minority Whip: Troy Lee James

Members of the 108th House of Representatives

Appt.- Member was appointed to current House Seat

See also
Ohio House of Representatives membership, 126th General Assembly
Ohio House of Representatives membership, 125th General Assembly
 List of Ohio state legislatures

References
Ohio House of Representatives official website
Project Vote Smart – State House of Ohio
Map of Ohio House Districts
Ohio District Maps 2002–2012
2006 election results from Ohio Secretary of State

Ohio legislative sessions
Ohio
Ohio
1969 in Ohio
1970 in Ohio